The 46th Golden Horse Awards was held on November 28, 2009.

Nominations and winners
Complete list of nominees and winners

Best Feature Film

Best Short Film

Best Documentary

Best Animation
(Absentee)

Best Director

Best Leading Actor

Best Leading Actress

Best Supporting Actor

Best Supporting Actress

Best New Performer

Best Original Screenplay

Best Screenplay Adaption

Best cinematography

Best Visual Effects

Best Art Direction

Best Makeup & Costume Design

Best Action Choreography

Best Original Film Score

Best Original Film Song

Best Film Editing

Best Sound Effect

The Outstanding Taiwanese Film of the Year

FIPRESCI Award

The Outstanding Taiwanese Filmmaker of the Year

Lifetime achievement award

Special Contribution Award

References

External links
Official website

46th
Taiwan Film Awards
2009 in Taiwan